Siccia sordida is a moth of the family Erebidae first described by Arthur Gardiner Butler in 1877. It is found in India, China, Thailand, Japan, and Sri Lanka.

References

Moths of Asia
Moths described in 1877